Etcetera Records is a Dutch/Belgian classical music record label founded in Amsterdam in 1982. The original founders were David Rossiter and Michel Arcizet.
In 2002 Coda Distribution bought the label with the late Paul Janse (1967-2014) and Dirk De Greef as A&R managers, later joined by Roman Jans.
Currently the label is based in Lummen, Belgium.

Selected artists
 Roberta Alexander
 Egidius Kwartet
 Roger Woodward

References

External links
 etcetera-records.com

Classical music record labels